Ghulat Ajib is a sub-district located in Raydah District, 'Amran Governorate, Yemen. Hamadah had a population of 4770 according to the 2004 census.

References 

Sub-districts in Raydah District